Ralph John Marino (January 2, 1928 – April 6, 2002) was an American lawyer and politician from New York. He was Temporary President of the New York State Senate from 1989 to 1994.

Life
Marino was born on January 2, 1928, in Rochester, New York. He served in the U.S. Army from 1946 to 1947. He graduated from Syracuse University in 1951; and from Fordham University School of Law in 1954. He met his wife Ethel Bernstein while studying at Syracuse. They married in 1954, and settled in her hometown of Oyster Bay on Long Island, and had three children. Marino practiced law in Oyster Bay, and entered politics as a  Republican.

Generally considered a Rockefeller Republican, he was first elected to the Senate in 1968 and became known for protecting Long Island's interests in Albany. He succeeded Warren M. Anderson as Temporary President and Majority Leader in 1989.

He was one of the very few downstate politicians to hold the Senate Majority Leader position and the first Long Islander to hold the position. Marino frequently sparred with Governor Mario Cuomo on the budget. The budget grew under his tenure as majority leader by some 50%.

He opposed George Pataki's nomination for governor in 1994. Pataki won the election, and as de facto party leader engineered a caucus room coup against Marino with the aid of much more conservative Republicans from Upstate and Western New York.  Despite the fact that Marino's deputy and closest ally, Jess J. Present, was in fact from Western New York, Pataki's opposition and the growth of the budget resulted in his ouster in November 1994. He was succeeded by Joseph Bruno, a conservative from the Capital District.

After sitting in the 178th, 179th, 180th, 181st, 182nd, 183rd, 184th, 185th, 186th, 187th, 188th, 189th, 190th and 191st New York State Legislatures, Marino resigned his Senate seat on February 8, 1995.

He died on April 6, 2002, in Mercy Medical Center in Rockville Centre, New York, of tongue cancer. His wife Ethel died May 10, 2004.

Sources 

1928 births
2002 deaths
Fordham University School of Law alumni
Syracuse University alumni
New York (state) Republicans
Majority leaders of the New York State Senate
Politicians from Rochester, New York
People from Oyster Bay (town), New York
20th-century American politicians
Lawyers from Rochester, New York
20th-century American lawyers